The Napier-Railton is an aero-engined racing car built in 1933, designed by Reid Railton to a commission by John Cobb, and built by Thomson & Taylor.  It was driven by Cobb, mainly at the Brooklands race track where it holds the all-time lap record which was set in 1935. The circuit was appropriated for military purposes during the Second World War, and never reopened in that form for racing. It has a W12 engine with 3 different exhaust systems.

History
Between 1933 and 1937, the Napier-Railton broke 47 world speed records at Brooklands, Autodrome de Linas-Montlhéry and Bonneville Salt Flats in Utah.

The 12 cylinders are in three banks of four (broad-arrow configuration), hence the triple exhaust system, and the engine has standard aerospace features such as dual magneto ignition. The non-synchromesh crash gearbox (named for the horrible noises caused by a mis-shift) has 3 ratios. The fuel tank, located in the boat-tail behind the driver,  has a capacity of 65 gallons  and fuel consumption was approximately 5 mpg. 

Following the Second World War, the car was, for a short time, repurposed to test the drogue chutes of aircraft. A problem arose when it was realised that the car had no brakes and had in past races simply rolled to a stop. This was seen as potentially dangerous so brakes were fitted to the back wheels in hopes of slowing the car sufficiently should the chute fail.

Postwar owners include Patrick Lindsay and Victor Gauntlett. The car was purchased by Brooklands Museum circa 1997 with the support of the UK's Heritage Lottery Fund and other donors.  It is maintained in fully working order and is normally on display in one of the museum's 1930s motoring sheds. The car is run regularly and is usually present at the Goodwood Revival motor race meeting every September.

Further reading

External links

Brooklands Society

Vehicles designed by Reid Railton
Vehicles powered by Napier Lion engines
Racing cars
Cars powered by aircraft engines